Winifred Byanyima (born 13 January 1959), is a Ugandan aeronautical engineer, politician, human rights activist, feminist and diplomat. She is the executive director of UNAIDS, effective November 2019.

From May 2013 until November 2019, she served as the executive director of Oxfam International. She has served as the director of the Gender Team in the Bureau for Development Policy at the United Nations Development Programme (UNDP) from 2006.

Background
Byanyima was born in Mbarara District in the Western Region of Uganda, a British protectorate at the time. Her parents are the late Boniface Byanyima, one-time national chairman of the Democratic Party in Uganda, and the late Gertrude Byanyima, a former schoolteacher who died in November 2008.  Winnie Byanyima attended Mount Saint Mary's College Namagunga in Mukono District. She went on to obtain a bachelor's degree in aeronautical engineering from the University of Manchester, becoming the first female Ugandan to become an aeronautical engineer. She later received a master's degree in mechanical engineering, specializing in energy conservation from Cranfield University.

Professional career
Following the completion of her training as an aeronautical engineer, Byanyima worked as a flight engineer for Uganda Airlines. When Yoweri Museveni started the 1981–1986 Ugandan Bush War, Byanyima left her job and joined the armed rebellion. Museveni and Byanyima had been raised together at the Byanyima household as children, with the Byanyima family paying for all Museveni's education and scholastic needs.

Museveni, Byanyima, and her husband Kizza Besigye were combatants in the National Resistance Army (NRA) during that war. Both Byanyima and her husband have since fallen out with the Ugandan president because of his repressive undemocratic rule despite his earlier stated convictions.

After the NRA won that war, Byanyima served as Uganda's ambassador to France from 1989 until 1994. She then returned home and became an active participant in Ugandan politics. She served as a member of the Constituent Assembly that drafted the 1995 Ugandan Constitution. She then served two consecutive terms as a member of parliament, representing Mbarara Municipality from 1994 until 2004. She was then appointed director of the Directorate of Women, Gender and Development at the headquarters of the African Union in Addis Ababa, Ethiopia. She served in that capacity until she was appointed as director of the Gender Team in the Bureau for Development Policy at UNDP in November 2006.

Executive Director of Oxfam, 2013–2019
In January 2013, Byanyima was announced as the next executive director of Oxfam International, replacing Jeremy Hobbs. Byanyima began her five-year directorship at Oxfam on 1 May 2013. In December 2017, she announced acceptance of an offer from Oxfam's Board of Supervisors to serve a second five-year term as Oxfam International's Executive Director.

In January 2015, Byanyima co-chaired the World Economic Forum in Davos. She used the forum to press for action to narrow the gap between rich and poor. The charity's research claims that the share of the world's wealth owned by the richest 1 percent of the world population had increased to nearly 50 percent in 2014, whereas 99 percent shares the other half. Oxfam's figures are strongly contested by several economists.

In November 2016, Byanyima was appointed by United Nations Secretary-General Ban Ki-moon to the High-Level Panel on Access to Medicines, co-chaired by Ruth Dreifuss, former President of Switzerland, and Festus Mogae, former President of Botswana.

Executive Director of UNAIDS, 2019–present
Byanyima was appointed as the executive director of UNAIDS in August 2019, by the United Nations Secretary-General, António Guterres, following a comprehensive selection process that involved a search committee constituted by members of the UNAIDS Programme Coordinating Board. In her new position she concurrently serves as a United Nations Under-Secretary-General.

In addition to her role at UNAIDS, Byanyima also serves a two-year term as member of the World Bank Group’s (WBG) Advisory Council on Gender and Development. Since 2022, she has been a member of the Commission for Universal Health convened by Chatham House and co-chaired by Helen Clark and Jakaya Kikwete.

Other activities
 Global Fund to Fight AIDS, Tuberculosis and Malaria, Member of the Board 
 Equality Now, Member of the Advisory Board
 International Gender Champions (IGC), Member

Personal life
On 7 July 1999, Byanyima married Kizza Besigye in Nsambya, Kampala. Besigye is the former chairman of the Forum for Democratic Change (FDC) political party in Uganda. They are the parents of one son named Anselm. Byanyima is a member of the FDC, although she has significantly reduced her participation in partisan Ugandan politics since she became a Ugandan diplomat in 2004. She has five siblings: Edith, Anthony, Martha, Abraham, and Olivia.

References

External links

 Biography of Mrs. Gertrude Byanyima, Winnie Byanyima's Mother
 2008 Interview With Winnie Byanyima
 Oxfam Chief On The Global Problem of Gender Equality – December 2013

Ugandan officials of the United Nations
Living people
1959 births
Ugandan aviators
Members of the Parliament of Uganda
Ugandan women engineers
Mbarara District
Ugandan engineers
Ambassadors of Uganda to France
Forum for Democratic Change politicians
People from Mbarara District
People from Western Region, Uganda
Alumni of the University of Manchester
Alumni of Cranfield University
20th-century Ugandan women politicians
20th-century Ugandan politicians
21st-century Ugandan women politicians
21st-century Ugandan politicians
Ugandan women ambassadors
People educated at Mount Saint Mary's College Namagunga
Aeronautical_engineers
21st-century women engineers
21st-century Ugandan women scientists
21st-century Ugandan scientists